The 2021–22 3. Liga was the 14th season of the 3. Liga. It was originally scheduled to start on 23 July 2021 and concluded on 14 May 2022; however, the opening match between VfL Osnabrück and MSV Duisburg had to be postponed after Duisburg was quarantined due to COVID-19 cases, delaying the season start by one day.

From this season onward, the German Football Association will allow clubs to place a sponsor logo on the back of their shirts.

The league fixtures were announced on 1 July 2021.

Teams

Team changes
Originally, SV Meppen was relegated from the 2020–21 3. Liga. However, KFC Uerdingen could not meet the licensing requirements, sparing Meppen from relegation.

Stadiums and locations

1 Viktoria Berlin will play their home matches at the Friedrich-Ludwig-Jahn-Stadion since their home stadium, the Stadion Lichterfelde, did not meet 3. Liga standards.
2 SC Freiburg II moved to the Dreisamstadion after SC Freiburg moved to the Europa-Park Stadion, since their previous home stadium, the Möslestadion, did not meet 3. Liga standards.
3 TSV Havelse will play their home matches at the HDI-Arena since their home stadium, the Wilhelm-Langrehr-Stadion in Garbsen, did not meet 3. Liga standards.
4 SC Verl will play their home matches at the Stadion am Lotter Kreuz since their home stadium, the Sportclub Arena in Verl, did not meet 3. Liga standards. They will move to the Benteler-Arena for the last five home matches of the season.

Personnel and kits

Managerial changes

League table

Results

Top scorers

Number of teams by state

Notes

References

2021–22 in German football leagues
2021–22
Germany